The Antarctic bottom water (AABW) is a type of water mass in the Southern Ocean surrounding Antarctica with temperatures ranging from −0.8 to 2 °C (35 °F) and salinities from 34.6 to 34.7 psu. As the densest water mass of the oceans, AABW is found to occupy the depth range below 4000 m of all ocean basins that have a connection to the Southern Ocean at that level.

The major significance of Antarctic bottom water is that it is the coldest bottom water, giving it a significant influence on the movement of the world's oceans. Antarctic bottom water also has a high oxygen content relative to the rest of the oceans' deep waters. This is due to the oxidation of deteriorating organic content in the rest of the deep oceans.  Antarctic bottom water has thus been considered the ventilation of the deep ocean.

Formation and circulation
Antarctic bottom water is created in part due to the major overturning of ocean water.

Antarctic bottom water is formed in the Weddell and Ross Seas, off the Adélie Coast and by Cape Darnley from surface water cooling in polynyas and below the ice shelf. A unique feature of Antarctic bottom water is the cold surface wind blowing off the Antarctic continent. The surface wind creates the polynyas which opens up the water surface to more wind. This Antarctic wind is stronger during the winter months and thus the Antarctic bottom water formation is more pronounced during the Antarctic winter season. Surface water is enriched in salt from sea ice formation. Due to its increased density, it flows down the Antarctic continental margin and continues north along the bottom. It is the densest water in the free ocean, and underlies other bottom and intermediate waters throughout most of the southern hemisphere.  The Weddell Sea Bottom Water is the densest component of the Antarctic bottom water.

Evidence indicates that Antarctic bottom water production through the Holocene (last 10,000 years) is not in a steady-state condition; that is to say that bottom water production sites shift along the Antarctic margin over decade to century timescales as conditions for the existence of polynyas change.  For example, the calving of the Mertz Glacier, which occurred on 12–13 February 2010, dramatically changed the environment for producing bottom water, reducing export by up to 23% in the region of Adelie Land.  Evidence from sediment cores, containing layers of cross-bedded sediments indicating phases of stronger bottom currents, collected on the Mac.Robertson shelf  and Adélie Land suggests that they have switched "on" and "off" again as important bottom water production sites over the last several thousand years.

Atlantic Ocean
Upon reaching the equator, about one-third of the northward flowing Antarctic bottom water enters the Guiana Basin, mainly through the southern half of the Equatorial Channel at 35°W. The other part recirculates and some of it flows through the Romanche Fracture Zone into the eastern Atlantic.

In the Guiana Basin, west of 40°W, the sloping topography and the strong, eastward flowing deep western boundary current might prevent the Antarctic bottom water from flowing west: thus it has to turn north at the eastern slope of the Ceará Rise. At 44°W, north of the Ceará Rise, Antarctic bottom water flows west in the interior of the basin. A large fraction of the Antarctic bottom water enters the eastern Atlantic through the Vema Fracture Zone.

Indian Ocean
In the Indian Ocean the Crozet-Kerguelen Gap allows Antarctic bottom water to move toward the equator. This northward movement amounts to 2.5 Sv. It takes the Antarctic Bottom Water 23 years to reach the Crozet-Kerguelen Gap.  South of Africa, Antarctic bottom water flow northwards through the Agulhas Basin and then east through the Agulhas Passage and over the southern margins of the Agulhas Plateau from where it is transported to into the Mozambique Basin.

Climate change 
Climate change and the subsequent melting of the Southern ice sheet have slowed the formation of AABW, and this slowdown is likely to continue. A complete shutdown of AABW formation is possible as soon as 2050. This shutdown would have dramatic effects on ocean circulation and global weather patterns.

Potential for AABW Disruption 
Due to the cold temperatures and high density of AABW, changes coming from increased surface water temperatures and increased ice melt can impact how the water flows. For surface water to become deep water, it must be very cold and saline. Much of the deep-water formation comes from brine rejection where the water deposited is extremely saline and cold, making it extremely dense. The increased ice melt that occurred starting in the early 2000s has created a period of fresher water between 2011-2015 within the bottom water. This has been distinctly prevalent in Antarctic bottom waters near West Antarctica primarily in the Weddell Sea area.

While the freshening of the AABW has corrected itself over the past few years with a decrease in ice melt, the potential for more ice melt in the future still poses a threat. With the potential increase in ice melt at extreme enough levels, it can have a serious impact on the ability for deep sea water to be formed. While this would create a slowdown referenced above, it may also create additional warming. Increased stratification coming from the fresher and warmer waters will reduce bottom and deep-water circulation and increase warm water flows around Antarctica. The sustained warmer surface waters would only increase the level of ice melt, stratification, and the slowdown of the AABW circulation and formation. Additionally, without the presence of those colder waters producing brine rejection which deposits to the AABW, there may eventually be no formation of bottom water around Antarctica anymore. This would impact more than Antarctica as AABW plays a major role in bottom water formation and deep-sea circulation which deposits oxygen to the deep sea and is a major carbon sink. Without these connections, the deep sea will become drastically changed with the potential for collapse in entire deep-sea communities.

References 

 Glossary of Physical Oceanography
 Steele, John H., Steve A. Thorpe and Karl K. Turekian, editors, Ocean Currents: A derivative of the Encyclopedia of Ocean Sciences, Academic Press, 1st ed., 2010 
 
 

Environment of Antarctica
Water masses
Physical oceanography